The Millers is an American sitcom that was created by Greg Garcia. The multi-camera series premiered on CBS as part of the 2013–14 American television season and aired from October 3, 2013 to July 18, 2015. The Millers is set in Leesburg, Virginia where Nathan Miller is a local television news reporter. His sister Debbie runs a combination yoga studio/vegan restaurant with her husband Adam, with whom she has a daughter named Mikayla. Nathan does not have any children and often hangs out with Ray, his friend who also serves as a cameraman for the fictional television station at which Nathan works. As the series begins, Nathan and Debbie's bickering parents, Tom and Carol Miller, are returning from Myrtle Beach. Nathan informs them he divorced his wife, Janice, several months ago. Tom responds by deciding to leave Carol after being married for forty-three years. Tom moves in with Debbie and Adam while Carol moves in with Nathan, each driving their children crazy. On March 13, 2014, The Millers was renewed for a second season, which premiered on October 20, 2014. 

After the series cancellation by CBS was announced on November 14, 2014, CBS broadcast the episode titled "CON-Troversy" on November 17, 2014, instead of the originally scheduled episode "Diggin' Up Bones". The episode "CON-Troversy" ended with a parting phrase, "I'll be back Monday. Which Monday? I don't know." Some season two episodes aired outside the United States months prior to their eventual burn-off broadcasts by CBS on Saturday nights in July 2015.  On November 27, 2014, CTV in Canada premiered an original episode not previously broadcast by CBS, titled "Papa Was a Rolling Bone." On January 14, 2015, M-Net in South Africa premiered another original episode never broadcast prior, titled "Highway to the Manger Zone". M-Net continued to premiere all the remaining episodes each week until the series finale aired on February 11, 2015. 

The series ran from October 3, 2013 to July 18, 2015 on CBS and aired 34 original episodes over two seasons.

Series overview

Episodes

Season 1 (2013–14)

Season 2 (2014–15)

References

Lists of American sitcom episodes